Matthew ("Matt") Geoffery Naylor (born 5 May 1983 in Bathurst, New South Wales) is a field hockey midfielder from Australia, who made his international senior debut for the national team in 2005 at the Hamburg Masters against the Netherlands. The mechanic was a member of The Kookaburras, the team that won the golden medal at the 2005 Champions Trophy.

External links
 Profile on Hockey Australia

1983 births
Living people
Australian male field hockey players
Male field hockey midfielders
2006 Men's Hockey World Cup players
People from the Central Tablelands
Sportsmen from New South Wales